Greg Brown (born November 26, 1972) is an American former basketball player and current high school coach.  He is known for his standout college career at the University of New Mexico, where he was Western Athletic Conference (WAC) Player of the Year in 1994 and won the Frances Pomeroy Naismith Award as the nation's best player under six feet tall.

Brown, a 5'7" point guard from Albuquerque High School, played collegiately at New Mexico Junior College from 1990 to 1992.  He moved to his hometown University of New Mexico to play for coach Dave Bliss from 1992 to 1994.  Brown led the Lobos to consecutive NCAA tournament berths in 1993 and 1994.  As a senior in 1993–94, Brown averaged 19.3 points per game and led the Lobos to their first regular season conference championship in 16 years.  At the end of the season, Brown was named the WAC player of the year and nationally was awarded the Frances Pomeroy Naismith Award, given to the top senior in the nation under six feet tall.

Brown was the head coach of his former high school, Albuquerque High School. In 2022, Brown was fired as head coach from Albuquerque High School, as they, "wanted new leadership in the boys basketball program."

References

External links
UNM Hall of Fame Bio

1972 births
Living people
American men's basketball players
High school basketball coaches in New Mexico
New Mexico Lobos men's basketball players
NMJC Thunderbirds men's basketball players
Point guards
Basketball players from Albuquerque, New Mexico